Tom Whitehead is a professional rugby league footballer who plays as a  or  for the Warrington Wolves in the Betfred Super League.

He has spent time on loan from Warrington at the Rochdale Hornets in Betfred League 1.

In 2022 Whitehead made his début for the Wire in the Super League against the Salford Red Devils.

References

External links
Warrington Wolves profile

2002 births
Living people
English rugby league players
Rochdale Hornets players
Rugby league second-rows
Warrington Wolves players